"The Other Girl" (stylized in all lowercase) is a song performed by American singer-songwriters Kelsea Ballerini and Halsey. It was released to country radio in the United States on April 20, 2020, as the second single from Ballerini's third studio album Kelsea (2020). Ballerini and Halsey co-wrote the song with Ross Copperman and Shane McAnally. It was released to pop radio formats in June 2020. The track received positive reviews from music critics who praised the lyrical storytelling and both women's performances. In the US, "The Other Girl" peaked at numbers 19 and 52 on the Billboard Hot Country Songs and Country Airplay charts, respectively. It also reached number 95 on the US Billboard Hot 100 songs chart. For promotion, Ballerini and Halsey performed the song live on the American television show CMT Crossroads on March 25, 2020. The song won a CMT Music Award for Performance of the Year, marking both artists' first award at the ceremony. An alternate solo recording of the song is also included on Ballerini's first remix album, Ballerini.

Critical reception 
Chris Parton of Sounds Like Nashville described the song as a "shimmering slice of futuristic country pop." Billy Dukes of Taste of Country wrote that the songwriters "practice exquisite word economy in drawing the setting and plot of this story, plus all the envy, anger, hurt that comes with it." Mike Wass of Idolator wrote that "both women have shown extraordinary versatility with previous genre-crossing collaborations," and cited "The Other Girl" as an example of the "increasingly blurred line between pop and country."

Chart performance
"The Other Girl" peaked at number 19 and 52 on the Billboard Hot Country Songs and Country Airplay charts, respectively, becoming the first single of Ballerini's career officially promoted to country radio to miss the top 40 on the latter. It also reached number 95 on the Billboard Hot 100 chart. "The Other Girl" also received crossover promotion to pop formats, and reached number 18 on the Billboard Adult Pop Songs chart and number 34 on the Billboard Mainstream Top 40 chart.

Live performance
Ballerini and Halsey performed "The Other Girl" on their episode of CMT Crossroads, which first aired March 25, 2020. The duo then performed the song at the 2020 CMT Music Awards. This performance won the award for Performance of the Year at the following CMT Music Awards in 2021, marking both Ballerini's and Halsey's first win at the award show.

Track listing
Digital download
 "The Other Girl (with Halsey) [The Other Mix]" – 3:23
 "The Other Girl (with Halsey)" – 3:21

 Titles are stylized in all lowercase, except for Halsey's name.

Awards and nominations

Charts

Weekly charts

Year-end charts

Certifications

Release history

References

2020 songs
2020 singles
Kelsea Ballerini songs
Halsey (singer) songs
Black River Entertainment singles
Female vocal duets
Songs written by Kelsea Ballerini
Songs written by Ross Copperman
Songs written by Shane McAnally